Henry Van der Weyde (1838–1924) was a Dutch-born English painter and photographer, best known for his photographic portraits of the late 19th century. His is considered a photographic pioneer in the use of electric light in photography. Amongst his portraits are architect William Burges (c.1880), Alexandra, Princess of Wales, A. E. Housman, actresses Mary Anderson (1887) and Dorothy Dene (1880s), Sir Edwin Arnold, bodybuilder Eugen Sandow (1889) and explorer Fridtjof Nansen (1897).

Biography
He was born Pieter Hendrik van der Weijde at Zierikzee in the Netherlands on 30 August 1838. He was the son of Doctor Pieter Hendrik van der Weijde Sr. and Jeannette Wilhelmina Lasserre. In 1850 his family emigrated to the United States and he later served in the American Civil War. He emigrated to England in 1870.  He set up his photographic studio at 182 Regent Street in London in 1877, and began using the logo "The Van der Weyde Light". That year he became the first photographer to install and take portraits by electric light which permitted him to make many portraits in a short period of time. A founding member of the Linked Ring Brotherhood, in 1892 he publicised his photo corrector (Rectograph) which is said to have "caused a stir in the world of photography".

References

External links

Photographs by Henry Van der Weyde at the Victoria and Albert Museum Collections website

Gallery 

1838 births
1924 deaths
19th-century American painters
19th-century English painters
19th-century English photographers
American male painters
Dutch emigrants to the United States
People from Zierikzee
Dutch emigrants to the United Kingdom
Photographers from London
19th-century American male artists